Reavis may refer to:

People with the surname
 C. Frank Reavis (1870–1832), American politician from Nebraska
 C. J. Reavis (born 1995), American football player
 Charles G. Reavis (born 1892), American politician from North Carolina
 Dave Reavis (born 1950), American football player
 Hattie King Reavis, American singer, song writer, and theater performer
 Isham Reavis (1836–1914), American jurist 
 James Reavis (1843–1914), the Baron of Arizona, a 19th-century forger and fraudster
 James Bradley Reavis (1848–1912), justice of the Washington Supreme Court
 Perri Stauffer Reavis, former radio presenter for KLTY, actress most recently co-star in Reflect and The Sweepers.
 Phil Reavis, (1936), American athlete
 Rafi Reavis (born 1977), a Filipino-American professional basketball player
 Wade Reavis (born 1876), American politician from North Carolina
 Waylon Reavis (born 1978), an American metal vocalist

People with the given name
 Reavis L. Mitchell Jr., American historian
 Reavis Z. Wortham, American writer

Other 
 HB Reavis, European real estate development company
 Reavis High School in Burbank, Illinois
 Reavis Falls in Arizona